The Potez XIX was a prototype French night bomber built by Potez in the 1920s.

Development
The Potez XIX first flew in 1923 but did not win orders from the French military. Tests of Potez XIX Bp.2 were conducted in Japan from August 31 to October 7, 1925. According to the test results, a small radius of action, a weak bomb load and poor communication between crew members were noted. Naturally, the Japanese military rejected this obsolete bomber.

Specifications (Potez XIX)

See also

References

019
1920s French bomber aircraft
Biplanes
Aircraft first flown in 1924